Kulakovka is a rural locality (a selo) in Starokalitvenskoye Rural Settlement, Rossoshansky District, Voronezh Oblast, Russia. The population was 163 as of 2010. There are 3 streets.

Geography 
It is located on the right bank of the Don River, 27 km ENE of Rossosh.

References 

Rural localities in Rossoshansky District